Richard Ball may refer to:

Richard Ball (Australian politician) (1857–1937)
Richard Ball (cyclist) (born 1944), American Olympic cyclist
Richard Ball (Michigan politician) (born 1932), Michigan politician
Ricky Ball, musician
Sir Richard Ball, 5th Baronet of the Ball baronets (born 1953)
Richard Amos Ball (1845–1925), British Methodist minister in Canada

See also
Rick Ball, Canadian sportscaster
Ball (surname)